Henry Steele (10 September 1911 – 1983) was a British sports shooter. He competed at the 1948 Summer Olympics, 1952 Summer Olympics and 1956 Summer Olympics.

References

1911 births
1983 deaths
British male sport shooters
Olympic shooters of Great Britain
Shooters at the 1948 Summer Olympics
Shooters at the 1952 Summer Olympics
Shooters at the 1956 Summer Olympics
People from Medway